Kainops is a genus of trilobites from the family Phacopidae, order Phacopida. It can be distinguished from Paciphacops by the greater number of facets to the eye (6–8 per row, compared to 3–4 in Paciphacops). The form of the furrow between the palpebral area and the palpebral lobe also distinguishes Kainops from the genera Paciphacops and Viaphacops.

Species included in the genus are:
Kainops chlupaci Budil & Kolář, 2004
Kainops ekphymus (Jones et al., 1986)
Kainops guttulus (Campbell 1967)
Kainops invius (Campbell 1977)
Kainops microps (Chatterton, Johnson and Campbell, 1979)
Kainops raymondi (Delo 1935)
Kainops veles (Chlupac 1972)

References

Phacopidae
Extinct animals of North America
Devonian trilobites
Phacopida genera
Fossil taxa described in 1991